Francesco Nelli (Florence – Naples, 1363) was the secretary of bishop Angelo Acciaioli I and a pastor at the Prior of the Church of the Holy Apostles in Florence. Nelli corresponded much with Francesco Petrarch as is evident by the fifty letters still existing of his to Petrarch, and the thirty-eight letters still existing from Petrarch to him. Six of the nineteen letters of Petrarch's Liber sine nomine are addressed to Nelli.

References
Liber Sine Nomine in Latin with letters # 6, #, 9, # 10, # 17, # 18, and # 19 to the priest Francesco Nelli of Florence
Petrarch (1973). Norman P. Zacour (tr.). Petrarch's Book Without A Name. . (Page 60)
Petrarch letters in JSTOR Modern Language Notes, Volume LXV May, 1950 Number 5 (ref: Francesco Nelli of Florence).
JSTOR Petrarch's Laelius, Chaucer's Lollius by Lillian Herlands Hornstein PMLA, Vol. 63, No. 1 (Mar., 1948), pp. 64-84
University of Florida, Department of Romance Languages and Literatures ITT 3530 special topics
"Petrach, Francesco (1304-1374)", Biography describes Petrarch becoming friends with Francesco Nelli, Ildebrandino Conti, Giovanni Boccaccio, Lapo da Castiglionchio, and Zanobi da Strada.

Clergy from Florence